Pecoraro is an Italian family name, derived from Latin pecurarius, "shepherd", from pecoris, "flock", a derivation of pecus , "sheep". It is a cognate of the standard Italian word for shepherd "pecoraio" , as well as, a Romanian word for shepherd "păcurar" .

People
Alfonso Pecoraro Scanio, Italian politician
Charlie Pecoraro, American actor
Elio Pecoraro, Italian football player
Miguel Ángel Pecoraro, former Argentine footballer
Nino Pecoraro, Italian spiritualist medium
Rocco Pecoraro, Italian rower
Susú Pecoraro, Argentine actress
Victor Pecoraro, Brazilian actor 
Vincent L. Pecoraro, professor at the University of Michigan

See also 
 Pecorara, Italy
 Păcurar (Păcuraru, Păcurariu)
 Pastor (surname)

Italian-language surnames
Occupational surnames